Ha Chang-rae (born 16 October 1994) is a South Korean footballer who plays as defender for Pohang Steelers.

Career

Ha played college football for Chung-Ang University.

Ha signed with Incheon United in January 2017.

References

External links 

1994 births
Living people
Association football defenders
South Korean footballers
Incheon United FC players
Pohang Steelers players
K League 1 players